Euphorbia tannensis subsp. tannensis is a species of herb or shrub native to Australia and some Pacific islands.

Description
It grows as a compact shrub up to 60 centimetres in height. It can be distinguished from the other subspecies of Euphorbia tannensis, E. tannensis subsp. eremophila, by its broader leaves; these are no more than 6.5 times as long as broad, whereas that are more than 8 times as long as broad in subsp. eremophila.

Taxonomy
As the autonym for the species, it is based upon the original publication of the species by Curt Polycarp Joachim Sprengel in 1809, but did not come into existence until the publication of E. tannensis subsp. eremophila in 1977.

Distribution and habitat
This subspecies occurs in Australia and some Pacific islands. In Australia it is restricted to the northern and eastern coasts.

References

tannensis subsp. tannensis
Malpighiales of Australia
Flora of the Northern Territory
Flora of Queensland
Flora of New South Wales
Plant subspecies